Dana Harry Ballard (1946-2022) was a professor of computer science at the University of Texas at Austin and formerly with the University of Rochester.

Ballard attended MIT and graduated in 1967 with his bachelor's degree in aeronautics and astronautics. He then attended the University of Michigan for his masters in information and control engineering in 1970. He received his Ph.D. from the University of California, Irvine in information engineering in 1974.  He did research in artificial intelligence and human cognition  and perception with a focus on the human visual system.  In 1982, with Christopher M. Brown he authored a pioneering textbook in the field of computer vision, titled Computer Vision. He also popularized the use of the generalised hough transform in computer vision in his paper "Generalizing the Hough Transform to Detect Arbitrary Shapes." He is also known as a proponent of active vision techniques for computer vision systems  as well as approaches to understanding human vision. His textbook titled "An Introduction to Natural Computation" (1997) combines introductory material on varied subjects relevant to computing in the brain, such as neural networks, reinforcement learning, and genetic learning. His most recent book, "Brain Computation as Hierarchical Abstraction," describes a multilevel approach to understanding neural computation.

References

Further reading
biographical dictionary of major figures in cognitive science

1946 births
University of Rochester faculty
University of Texas at Austin faculty
University of California, Irvine alumni
Living people
Computer vision researchers
MIT School of Engineering alumni
Artificial intelligence researchers
University of Michigan College of Engineering alumni
Fellows of the Cognitive Science Society